Marc Carlos Francis de Jesus de Leon (born February 20, 1995), better known as McCoy de Leon, is a Filipino actor, dancer and commercial model. He is known as a member of #Hashtags, a male-group dance performer on the noontime variety show It's Showtime on ABS-CBN.

In 2016, he joined Pinoy Big Brother: Lucky 7 along with his co-hashtag member Nikko Natividad as a 2-in-1 celebrity housemate.

Early life and education
De Leon attended high school at San Sebastian College – Recoletos. He then tried to obtain a Bachelor of Science in Civil Engineering at Mapúa University, but decided to stop to pursue his career.

Personal life 
On January 4, 2023, de Leon publicly confirmed his split with his former partner and the mother of his child, Elisse Joson.

Filmography

Movies

Television

Awards and nominations

References

External links
 

1995 births
Living people
Filipino male dancers
Pinoy Big Brother contestants
ABS-CBN personalities
TV5 (Philippine TV network) personalities
Viva Artists Agency
Star Magic
People from Tondo, Manila